The 2004–05 season was the 125th season of competitive football by Rangers.

Overview 
Rangers played a total of 51 competitive matches during the 2004–05 season. They went into the season looking to recapture their Scottish Premier League crown, which Celtic had won the season before. Manager Alex McLeish made several summer signings, with the signature of Frenchman Jean-Alain Boumsong being his biggest coup. Others included strikers Dado Prso and Nacho Novo, as well as the experienced midfielder Alex Rae and future Ibrox favourite Marvin Andrews.

Rangers League form began poorly picking up only 8 points from their first 5 matches.  Rangers lost the first Old Firm derby of the season 1–0 at Celtic Park and fell behind Celtic in the league.  Rangers form improved following the loss to Celtic and they weren't to lose again in the league until April.  This run of form included two wins over Celtic in November, once in the League Cup and the other in the League.  They also ended a poor run of results at Celtic Park, with a 2–0 victory in February.  A 2–1 loss to Celtic at home in April left Rangers five points behind with just four games left of the season.  Celtic led by two points on the final day of the season and were winning 1–0 against Motherwell, but two late goals for Motherwell coupled with Rangers 1–0 win over Hibernian saw Rangers win the title, Helicopter Sunday.

Rangers also won the League Cup this season, with a 5–1 victory over Motherwell in the final. Rangers were beaten in the Scottish Cup however, losing 2–1 to Celtic in the third round.

After losing to CSKA Moscow in the third qualifying round of the Champions League, Rangers entered the UEFA Cup.  Rangers managed to qualify for the newly formed group stages with a penalty shoot-out win over Maritimo. Rangers failed to progress beyond the group stages however, a 2–0 loss at home to Auxerre seeing them fail to stay in Europe beyond Christmas.

Players

Squad information

Transfers

In

Total spending: £8.45m

Out

Total received: £10.825m

Squad statistics

Goal scorers

Disciplinary record

Club

Board of directors

Coaching staff

Other staff

Matches

Scottish Premier League

UEFA Champions League

UEFA Cup

Scottish Cup

League Cup

Friendlies

Competitions

Overall

Scottish Premier League

Standings

References

Rangers F.C. seasons
Rangers
Scottish football championship-winning seasons